Ida is a 2013 Polish drama film directed by Paweł Pawlikowski and written by Pawlikowski and Rebecca Lenkiewicz. Set in Poland in 1962, it is about a young woman on the verge of taking vows as a Catholic nun. Orphaned as an infant during the German occupation of World War II, she must now meet her aunt. The former Communist state prosecutor and only surviving relative tells her that her parents were Jewish. The two women embark on a road trip into the Polish countryside to learn the fate of their family.

The following is a list of awards received by Ida:

Industry awards

International film festivals awards

Specialised film festivals awards

Regionalised film festivals awards

European film festivals awards

Polish film festivals awards

2013: Warsaw Jewish Film Festival, awards for the best full feature film, for the best actress (Agata Kulesza), for the best shots

Thematic film festival awards

Film Critics Society Awards

Other awards

Rankings and Year-End Lists

Indiewire 2014 Year-End Critics Poll

Appearances and presentations

References

External links
 

Lists of accolades by film